Harold is an unincorporated community located in Floyd County, Kentucky, United States.

A post office was established in the community in 1905, and named for local merchant Harold Hatcher of the Hatcher family of early area settlers.

Professional baseball player Dixie Howell was born in Harold.

The United States Census Bureau, combines Harold with Betsy Layne, Banner, Dana, Ivel Stanville and Tram as combined Census County Division. It had a population of 4,601 at the 2020 census.

References

Unincorporated communities in Floyd County, Kentucky
Unincorporated communities in Kentucky